is one of the original 40 throws of Judo as developed by Jigoro Kano. It belongs to the fifth group,
Gokyo, of the traditional throwing list, Gokyo (no waza), of Kodokan Judo. It is also part of the current 67 Throws of Kodokan Judo. It is classified as a side sacrifice technique, Yoko-sutemi.

Technique description 
The person performing the technique (tori) pushes his opponent (uke) until uke resists and pushes back. At the moment of maximum forward push by uke, tori falls quickly to the mat directly in front of, close to, and perpendicular to the feet of uke. While dropping, tori rotates his body to pull uke over him and to the ground. As a sacrifice throw, tori is putting himself into a vulnerable position on the mat so the timing must be such that uke is quickly thrown over tori and has no chance to drop down onto tori.

Included systems 
Systems:
Kodokan Judo, Judo Lists
Lists:
The Canon Of Judo
Judo technique

Similar techniques, variants, and aliases 
English aliases:
Side separation

Ude gaeshi 
Ude gaeshi is considered to be a variation of yoko wakare.
It is demonstrated by Kyuzo Mifune in The Essence of Judo and described in The Canon Of Judo.

References

External links 
 Information on the Techniques of Judo.

Judo technique